In mathematics, a matrix of ones or all-ones matrix is a matrix where every entry is equal to one. Examples of standard notation are given below:

Some sources call the all-ones matrix the unit matrix, but that term may also refer to the identity matrix, a different matrix.

A vector of ones or all-ones vector is matrix of ones having row or column form; it should not be confused with unit vectors.

Properties
For an  matrix of ones J, the following properties hold:

 The  trace of J equals n, and the determinant equals 0 for n ≥ 2, but equals 1 if n = 1.
 The rank of J is 1 and the eigenvalues are n with multiplicity 1 and 0 with  multiplicity .
  for 
 J is the neutral element of the Hadamard product.

When J is considered as a matrix over the real numbers, the following additional properties hold:
 J is positive semi-definite matrix.
The matrix  is idempotent.
The matrix exponential of J is

Applications
The all-ones matrix arises in the mathematical field of combinatorics, particularly involving the application of algebraic methods to graph theory.  For example, if A is the adjacency matrix of an n-vertex undirected graph G, and J is the all-ones matrix of the same dimension, then G is a regular graph if and only if AJ = JA.  As a second example, the matrix appears in some linear-algebraic proofs of Cayley's formula, which gives the number of spanning trees of a complete graph, using the matrix tree theorem.

See also
 Zero matrix, a matrix where all entries are zero
 Single-entry matrix

References

Matrices
1 (number)